Munich Reinsurance America (also called Munich Re America), formerly known as American Re-Insurance Corporation before September 2006, is a major provider of property and casualty reinsurance in the United States. Munich Reinsurance America is a subsidiary of Munich Re. Founded in 1917, the company's headquarters is located in Princeton, New Jersey, with regional offices in San Francisco, Chicago and New York. The company offers services that provide clients protection from global disasters such as climate change.

History 
In 1948, American Re-Insurance purchased the American Reserve Insurance Company. American Reserve had itself integrated the American Phenix Corporation of New York in 1932 after the liquidation of American Phenix.

Acquisition

In 1996 Munich Re acquired American Re for roughly $3.8 billion. Additional funds were needed to expand reserves for casualty and asbestos policies.

Divisions

Reinsurance Division
Munich Re Specialty Insurance (MRSI) - Successor of Specialty Markets division
Corporate Insurance Partners

Affiliates

Hartford Steam Boiler Inspection and Insurance Company (HSB)
American Modern Insurance Group

These divisions provide insurance in multiple sectors.

References

Insurance companies of the United States
Reinsurance companies
Companies based in Princeton, New Jersey